Lanzia is a genus of fungi within the family Rutstroemiaceae.

The genus name of Lanzia is in honour of Matteo Lanzi (1824-1908), who was an Italian doctor, botanist (Mycology and Algology) and diatom researcher. He worked as a lecturer at the University in Rome.

The genus was circumscribed by Pier Andrea Saccardo in Bot. Centralbl. vol.18 on pages 218 and 306 in 1884.

Species
The following species are recognised in the genus Lanzia:
 
 Lanzia allantospora
 Lanzia antarctica
 Lanzia australis
 Lanzia blumenaviensis
 Lanzia cantareirensis
 Lanzia caryopsicola
 Lanzia castanopsidis
 Lanzia coracina
 Lanzia cuniculi
 Lanzia eburnea
 Lanzia equiseti
 Lanzia fibrilosa
 Lanzia flavoaurantia
 Lanzia flavorufa
 Lanzia glenii
 Lanzia guangxiensis
 Lanzia helotioides
 Lanzia huangshanica
 Lanzia kosciuszkoensis
 Lanzia longipes
 Lanzia luteovirescens
 Lanzia minuta
 Lanzia moniliformae
 Lanzia novae-zelandiae
 Lanzia ovispora
 Lanzia parasitica
 Lanzia pteridiicola
 Lanzia reticulata
 Lanzia sinensis
 Lanzia stellariae
 Lanzia thindii
 Lanzia ulmariae
 Lanzia velutinosa
 Lanzia viburni

References

External links
Index Fungorum

Helotiales